Ruben Van Wyk (born 16 June 1976) is a retired Namibian footballer. He competed for the Namibia national football team from 1992-1998, including the 1998 African Cup of Nations. He played for Liverpool Okahandja and Black Africa S.C.

References

1976 births
Living people
Namibia international footballers
Namibian men's footballers
1998 African Cup of Nations players
Namibia Premier League players
Black Africa S.C. players

Association footballers not categorized by position